S83 may refer to:
 Daihatsu Hijet (S83), a kei truck and microvan
 S83 Lankao–Nanyang Expressway, China
 Savoia-Marchetti S.83 an Italian airliner
 Suzuki Boulevard S83, a motorcycle